Jonathan or Jon Kent may refer to:

 Jonathan Kent (director) (born 1949), British theatre and opera director
 Jonathan Kent (cricketer) (born 1973), English cricketer
 Jon Kent (cricketer) (born 1979), South African cricketer

Comics
 Jonathan and Martha Kent, DC Comics characters, Superman's adoptive parents
 Jon Kent (DC Comics), the son of Superman in various stories and the Superboy in DC Comics such as Convergence, Superman: Lois and Clark, and DC Rebirth
 Jon Lane Kent, son of Superman and Lois Lane from an alternate future in the Superboy comics
 Jonathan Kent, alias of Lar Gand  Mon-El in the Superman comics

See also
 John Kent (disambiguation)
 Jack Kent (disambiguation)